Seyfəli may refer to:

Aşağı Seyfəli
Yuxarı Seyfəli
Seyfali Kandi